Blight refers to a specific symptom affecting plants in response to infection by a pathogenic organism.

Description
Blight is a rapid and complete chlorosis, browning, then death of plant tissues such as leaves, branches, twigs, or floral organs.  Accordingly, many diseases that primarily exhibit this symptom are called blights. Several notable examples are:
 Late blight of potato, caused by the water mold Phytophthora infestans (Mont.) de Bary, the disease which led to the Great Irish Famine
 Southern corn leaf blight, caused by the fungus Cochliobolus heterostrophus (Drechs.) Drechs, anamorph Bipolaris maydis (Nisikado & Miyake) Shoemaker, incited a severe loss of corn in the United States in 1970.
 Chestnut blight, caused by the fungus Cryphonectria parasitica (Murrill) Barr, has nearly completely eradicated mature American chestnuts in North America.
 Citrus blight, caused by an unknown agent, infects all citrus scions.
 Fire blight of pome fruits, caused by the bacterium Erwinia amylovora (Burrill) Winslow et al., is the most severe disease of pear and also is found in apple and raspberry, among others.
 Bacterial leaf blight of rice, caused by the bacterium Xanthomonas oryzae (Uyeda & Ishiyama) Dowson.
 Bacterial seedling blight of rice (Oryza sativa), caused by pathogen Burkholderia plantarii
 Early blight of potato and tomato, caused by species of the ubiquitous fungal genus Alternaria
 Leaf blight of the grasses e.g. Ascochyta species and Alternaria triticina that causes blight in wheat
 Bur oak blight, caused by the fungal pathogen Tubakia iowensis.
 South American leaf blight, caused by the ascomycete Pseudocercospora ulei, also called Microcyclus ulei, ended the cultivation of the rubber tree (Hevea brasiliensis) in South America.

On leaf tissue, symptoms of blight are the initial appearance of lesions which rapidly engulf surrounding tissue. However, leaf spots may, in advanced stages, expand to kill entire areas of leaf tissue and thus exhibit blight symptoms.

Blights are often named after their causative agent. For example, Colletotrichum blight is named after the fungus Colletotrichum capsici, and Phytophthora blight is named after the water mold Phytophthora parasitica.

When blights have been particularly vast and consequential in their effects, they have become named historical events, such as the 19th Century Potato Blight, also known locally from its primary consequence as the Great famine, the Great Famine of Ireland, and Highland Potato Famine, and the near extinction of the Bermuda cedar during the 1940s and 1950s in the event described as The Blight or The Cedar Blight.

Gallery

References

External links
 
 

Plant pathogens and diseases
Mycology